Gene Havlick (March 16, 1894 in Enid, Oklahoma, USA – May 11, 1959 in Los Angeles, California) was an American film editor.

He was nominated for three Academy Awards, winning one.

He worked on over 100 films during his 30-year career.

Early life 
Eugene Charles Havlicek was born in Enid, Oklahoma to Frank Havlicek and Agnes Petricka, of Czech descent. His parents married in Heidelberg, Minnesota. Frank was a cabinet-maker, and later, an undertaker. By 1900, the family went by "Havlick".

Filmography

 The Crimson Canyon (1928)
 Beauty and Bullets (1928)
 Grit Wins (1929)
 The Border Wildcat (1929)
 The Fall of Eve (1929)
 The Smiling Terror (1929)
 The Ridin' Demon (1929)
 The College Coquette (1929)
 Song of Love (1929)
 A Royal Romance (1930)
 Sisters (1930)
 Brothers (1930)
 Madonna of the Streets (1930)
 The Last Parade (1931)
 The Sky Raiders (1931)
 Lover Come Back (1931)
 Fifty Fathoms Deep (1931)
 A Dangerous Affair (1931)
 The Deceiver (1931)
 The Menace (1932)
 Shopworn (1932)
 Attorney for the Defense (1932)
 Hollywood Speaks (1932)
 War Correspondent (1932)
 The Last Man (1932)
 Vanity Street (1932)
 The Woman I Stole (1933)
 Lady for a Day (1933)
 Master of Men (1933)
 It Happened One Night (1934)
 Twentieth Century (1934)
 Blind Date (1934)
 Broadway Bill (1934)
 Eight Bells (1935)
 Unknown Woman (1935)
 She Couldn't Take It (1935)
 If You Could Only Cook (1935)
 Mr. Deeds Goes to Town (1936)
 Lost Horizon (1937)
 A Dangerous Adventure (1937)
 It's All Yours (1937)
 Start Cheering (1938)
 Extortion (1938)
 Law of the Plains (1938)
 You Can't Take It With You (1938)
 Blondie (1938)
 My Son Is a Criminal (1939)
 Blondie Meets the Boss (1939)
 Missing Daughters (1939)
 Mr. Smith Goes to Washington (1939)
 His Girl Friday (1940)
 Blondie on a Budget (1940)
 Blondie Has Servant Trouble (1940)
 Angels Over Broadway (1940)
 Blondie Goes Latin (1941)
 She Knew All the Answers (1941)
 Our Wife (1941)
 Go West, Young Lady (1941)
 Shut My Big Mouth (1942)
 The Wife Takes a Flyer (1942)
 Counter-Espionage (1942)
 The Desperadoes (1943)
 Destroyer (1943)
 Once Upon a Time (1944)
 Kansas City Kitty (1944)
 The Unwritten Code (1944)
 Youth on Trial (1945)
 A Thousand and One Nights (1945)
 Snafu (1945)
 The Gentleman Misbehaves (1946)
 The Walls Came Tumbling Down (1946)
 Sing While You Dance (1946)
 Dead Reckoning (1947)
 It Had to Be You (1947)
 Relentless (1948)
 The Return of October (1948)
 Shockproof (1949)
 Rusty Saves a Life (1949)
 Lust for Gold (1949)
 The Reckless Moment (1949)
 Fortunes of Captain Blood (1950)
 Rogues of Sherwood Forest (1950)
 Between Midnight and Dawn (1950)
 Santa Fe (1951)
 Dick Turpin's Ride (1951)
 The Son of Dr. Jekyll (1951)
 My Six Convicts (1952)
 Captain Pirate (1952)
 Hangman's Knot (1952)
 Voodoo Tiger (1952)
 Serpent of the Nile (1953)
 The Last Posse (1953)
 Valley of Head Hunters (1953)
 The Stranger Wore a Gun (1953)
 Killer Ape (1953)
 The Iron Glove (1954)
 The Saracen Blade (1954)
 Jungle Man-Eaters (1954)
 Three Hours to Kill (1954)
 Ten Wanted Men (1955)
 New Orleans Uncensored (1955)
 A Lawless Street (1955)
 Inside Detroit (1956)
 7th Cavalry (1956)
 Domino Kid (1957)
 Screaming Mimi (1958)

Academy Awards
All 3 are in the category of Best Film Editing.

10th Academy Awards-Nominated for Lost Horizon. Nomination shared with Gene Milford. Won.
11th Academy Awards-Nominated for You Can't Take It With You. Lost to The Adventures of Robin Hood.
12th Academy Awards-Nominated for Mr. Smith Goes to Washington, nomination shared with Al Clark. Lost to Gone with the Wind.

References

External links

American film editors
Filmmakers from Enid, Oklahoma
1894 births
1959 deaths
Best Film Editing Academy Award winners
American people of Czech descent